The following is a list of crossings of the Mekong River. The Mekong is a river in Southeast Asia. It is the world's 12th-longest river and the 7th-longest in Asia. From the Tibetan Plateau, this river runs through China's Yunnan province, Burma (Myanmar), Laos, Thailand, Cambodia, and Vietnam.

China
 Baoshan-Dali Railway Bridge (under construction)
 New Jinghong Bridge, Yunnan (G214)
 Old Jinghong Bridge, Yunnan
 Jinghong Dam Bridge, Yunnan
 Lancang to Simao Bridge (S309), Yunnan
 Lincang to Jinggu Bridge (G323), Yunnan
 Dachaoshan Dam Bridge, Yunnan
 Manwan Bridge (G214 Old Route), Yunnan
 Lincang to Dali Bridge (G214 New Route), Yunnan
 Fengqing to Lushi Bridge, Yunnan
 Changning to Goujie Bridge, Yunnan
 Baoshan to Dali Expressway (G56), Yunnan
 Old Baoshan to Dali Bridge (G320), Yunnan
 County Road X088, Yunnan
 Tianbaxin Bridge, Yunnan
 Jizhou Bridge, Yunnan
 Luqiang Bridge, Yunnan
 Biaocun Bridge, Yunnan
 Shangsongping Bridge, Yunnan
 Hetaoping Bridge, Yunnan
 Tu’e Bridge, Yunnan
 Atadeng Bridge, Yunnan
 Provincial Highway S311 Bridge, Yunnan
 Zhongcun Bridge, Yunnan
 Jinman Bridge, Yunnan
 Yingpan Bridge, Yunnan
 County Road Q20 Bridge, Yunnan
 Wendeng Bridge, Yunnan
 Qingmenkou Bridge, Yunnan
 Lazhuhe Bridge, Yunnan
 Baishiping Bridge, Yunnan
 Zhongpai Bridge, Yunnan
 Weida Bridge, Yunnan
 Qiqi Bridge, Yunnan
 Fuchuan Bridge, Yunnan
 Zhonglu Bridge, Yunnan
 Jigetu Bridge, Yunnan
 Gongle Bridge, Yunnan
 Xialuoga Bridge, Yunnan
 Nuoge Bridge, Yunnan
 Gongchang Bridge, Yunnan
 Zhuangfang Bridge, Yunnan
 Muzuoluo Bridge, Yunnan
 Diziluo Bridge, Yunnan
 Kangpu Bridge, Yunnan
 Yezhi Bridge, Yunnan
 Geding Bridge, Yunnan
 Bading Bridge, Yunnan
 Badi Bridge, Yunnan
 Badi Dam Bridge, Yunnan
 Achidaga Bridge, Yunnan
 Cizhong Bridge, Yunnan
 Yanmen Bridge, Yunnan
 Yeka Bridge, Yunnan
 Yongzhi Bridge, Yunnan
 Siyonggu Bridge, Yunnan
 Ninong Bridge, Yunnan
 Mingyong Bridge, Yunnan
 Yunnan-Tibet Highway Bridge 1 (G214), Yunnan
 Yunnan-Tibet Highway Bridge 2 (G214), Yunnan
 Adong Bridge, Tibet
 Chuba Bridge, Tibet
 Muxu Bridge, Tibet
 Ride Bridge, Tibet
 Suxue Bridge, Tibet
 Leding Bridge, Tibet
 Dingxue Bridge, Tibet
 Sichuan-Tibet Highway Old Bridge, Tibet
 Sichuan-Tibet Highway New Bridge (G318), Tibet

Myanmar/Laos

Kenglat, Shan/Xieng Kok, Luang Namtha
 Myanmar–Lao Friendship Bridge

Laos

Champasak
 Pakse Bridge
 Muang Khong Bridge

Sainyabuli-Luang Prabang
 Pakkhone-Thadeua Bridge

Oudomxay-Sainyabuli
 Muang Ngeun-Pak Beng Bridge

Sainyabuli-Vientiane Province
 Pak Lay Bridge

Thailand/Laos

Nong Khai/Vientiane Prefecture
 First Thai–Lao Friendship Bridge

Mukdahan/Savannakhet
 Second Thai–Lao Friendship Bridge

Nakhon Phanom/Thakhek
 Third Thai–Lao Friendship Bridge

Chiang Khong/Ban Houayxay
 Fourth Thai–Lao Friendship Bridge

Bung Kan/Bolikhamsai
 Fifth Thai–Lao Friendship Bridge

Ubon Ratchathani/Salavan
 Sixth Thai–Lao Friendship Bridge

Loei/Vientiane
 Seventh Thai–Lao Friendship Bridge

Cambodia

Stung Treng
 Stung Treng Bridge (Mekong River)

Stung Treng
 Sekong Bridge (Tonle Sekong River)

Kampong Cham
 Kizuna Bridge

Kandal
 Prek Tamak Bridge

Phnom Penh
 Monivong Bridge (Bassac River)

Kandal - Phnom Penh
 Takhmao Bridge (Bassac River)

Kandal - Prey Veng
 Neak Loeung Bridge

Vietnam

 Mỹ Thuận Bridge (Tiền Giang Province - Vĩnh Long Province)
 Rạch Miễu Bridge (Tiền Giang Province - Bến Tre Province)
 Hàm Luông Bridge (Bến Tre Province)
 Cần Thơ Bridge (Vĩnh Long Province - Cần Thơ City)
 Cổ Chiên Bridge (Bến Tre Province - Trà Vinh Province)
 Cao Lãnh Bridge (Đồng Tháp Province)
 Vàm Cống Bridge (Đồng Tháp Province - Cần Thơ City, under construction)

References

 01
Bridges in Thailand
Bridges in Vietnam
Bridges in Laos
Bridges in Cambodia
Bridges in Myanmar
Mekong River 
Mekong River